

Portugal
 Angola – José Baptista de Andrade, Governor-General of Angola (1873–1876)

United Kingdom
 Malta Colony – Charles van Straubenzee, Governor of Malta (1872–1878)
 New South Wales – Hercules Robinson, Lord Rosmead, Governor of New South Wales (1872–1879)
 Queensland – George Phipps, Lord Normanby, Governor of Queensland (1871–1874)
 Tasmania – Sir Charles Du Cane, Governor of Tasmania (1869–1874)
 South Australia – Sir Anthony Musgrave, Governor of South Australia (1873–1877)
 Victoria – George Bowen, Governor of Victoria (1873–1879)
 Western Australia – Major Frederick Weld, Governor of Western Australia(1869–1875)

Colonial governors
Colonial governors
1874